Bollen is a surname. Notable people with the surname include:

Christopher Bollen (born 1975), American writer
Clemens Bollen (born 1948), German politician
George Bollen (1826–1892), homeopathic doctor in South Australia
Johan Bollen (born 1969), Belgian scientist
Kenneth A. Bollen (born 1951), American sociologist